Terence Meaden is an English author who writes on archaeoastronomy, mostly focusing on the megalithic sites of Avebury, Stonehenge and the Drombeg stone circle in Cork, Ireland. He is a retired physicist with a doctoral degrees in physics from the University of Oxford and a master's degree in applied landscape archaeology also from University of Oxford. Meaden is influenced by the work of archaeologist Marija Gimbutas who wrote about the Goddess worshipping Neolithic and Bronze Age cultures of "Old Europe".

Hieros Gamos

Meaden argues it was the power of a strong religious narrative that underlies the purpose of these megaliths. Drombeg stone circle is based on the cosmological fertility drama of the marriage of the sky God and earth Goddess known to the Classical Greeks much later as the hieros gamos. He states that the same principles also explain the placement of megaliths at Avebury and Stonehenge, although both sites are now damaged and incomplete.  Fertility symbolism explains the religious elements behind the culture of the farming communities who were very dependent on the timely arrival of seasonal weather and the fertility of crops, livestock and women.

In pre-literate times, Neolithic people expressed meaning through images and symbols displayed at stone circles. Meaden determined the core idea behind the building of Stonehenge and Avebury by spotting and interpreting key symbolism.  A documentary filmed in 1998 for Channel 4 and the Discovery Channel detailed his hieros gamos concept.

At Stonehenge on midsummer morning, a phallic shadow is cast from the "Heel" stone; this penetrates to the centre of the monument where its tip touches the "Goddess" stone. In his book, "Stonehenge, Avebury and Drombeg Stone Circle Deciphered", he wrote that most stone circles were planned as sunrise fertility monuments, and so need to be studied at sunrise.

Meaden writes that the Neolithic calendar was based on the eight festival dates of traditional agriculture, corresponding roughly to the pagan Wheel of the Year.

Drombeg Stone Circle

At Drombeg stone circle, photographs taken at sunrise on each of the eight festival occasions demonstrate that Drombeg's builders used solar archaeoastronomy when designing their circle.  The summer solstice marks the occasion of the consummation of the classic Marriage of the Gods, uniting the Sky Father with the Earth Mother. This act of consummation between stones representing divinities was devised as an action spectacle for the Neolithic people.

Bibliography 
The Goddess of the Stones: Language of the Megaliths Hardcover (Souvenir Press, 1991)
Stonehenge: The Secret of the Solstice (Souvenir Press, 1997)
The Secret of the Avebury Stones (Souvenir Press, 1999)
Stonehenge, Avebury and Drombeg Stone Circles Deciphered: The archaeological decoding of the core symbolism and meanings planned into these ancient British and Irish monuments (LAP Lambert Academic Publishing, 2016)
A New Bible in Three Testaments: The Book of the Universe, Stars, Sun, Earth, Life and Humankind (New Generation Publishing, 2018)
The Old Stones: A Field Guide to the Megalithic Sites of Britain and Ireland (Watkins Publishing, 2018) Contributor

Notes

External links
 

1935 births
Academics of the University of Oxford
Alumni of the University of Oxford
British archaeologists
British physicists
British meteorologists
British atheists
Living people